Strands IF is a Swedish football club located in Hudiksvall.

Background
Strands IF currently plays in Division 3 Södra Norrland which is the fifth tier of Swedish football. They play their home matches at the Glysis Sparbanken Arena in Hudiksvall.

The club is affiliated to Hälsinglands Fotbollförbund.  Strands IF won the Norrländska Mästerskapet in 1925.

Season to season

Footnotes

External links
 Strands IF – Official website

Football clubs in Gävleborg County